The New Journal is a magazine at Yale University that publishes creative nonfiction about Yale and New Haven. Inspired by New Journalism writers like Tom Wolfe and Gay Talese, the student-run publication was established by Daniel Yergin and Peter Yeager in 1967 to publish investigative pieces and in-depth interviews. It publishes five issues per year. The magazine is distributed free of charge at Yale and in New Haven and was among the first university publications not to charge a subscription fee.

Notable alumni 
 Anne Applebaum, Pulitzer Prize winner for Gulag: A History, staff writer for The Atlantic
 James Bennet, former editor-in-chief of The Atlantic
 Emily Bazelon, staff writer for The New York Times Magazine, former senior editor for Slate, and senior research fellow at Yale Law School
 Richard Bradley, editor of Worth magazine
 Jay Carney, White House press secretary under Barack Obama
 Richard Conniff, writer of books, articles, and television screenplays about nature; winner of the 1997 National Magazine Award and a 2007 Guggenheim Fellowship
 Roger Cohn, former editor-in-chief of Mother Jones 
 Elisha Cooper, American writer and children's book author
 Andy Court, producer, 60 Minutes
 Cassie da Costa, staff writer at Vanity Fair
 David Dunlap, reporter for The New York Times
 Dana Goodyear, staff writer at The New Yorker and co-founder of Figment
 Paul Goldberger, Pulitzer Prize-winning architectural critic and Contributing Editor for Vanity Fair
 Darren Gersh, Washington, D.C. bureau chief for Nightly Business Report
 Charlotte Howard, New York Bureau Chief and Energy and Commodities Editor for The Economist
 Tom Isler, documentary filmmaker
 Anya Kamenetz, writer, Fast Company; author, DIY U and Generation Debt
 Ellen Katz, law professor at the University of Michigan Law School
 Stuart Klawans, film critic for The Nation
 Brendan Koerner, contributing editor at Wired magazine
 Elizabeth Kolbert, Pulitzer Prize winner for The Sixth Extinction: An Unnatural History, staff writer at The New Yorker 
 Lawrence Lasker, screenwriter and producer, nominated for an Academy Award in 1983 for WarGames
 Sarah Laskow, senior editor at The Atlantic
 Samantha Power, Pulitzer Prize winner for A Problem from Hell: America and the Age of Genocide, 28th United States Ambassador to the United Nations
 Motoko Rich, Tokyo Bureau Chief for The New York Times
 Sanjena Sathian, novelist; author, Gold Diggers
 Hampton Sides, journalist and historian; editor-at-large of Outside magazine; author, Hellhound on His Trail, Ghost Soldiers, Blood and Thunder
 Gabriel Snyder, former editor-in-chief of The New Republic
 John Swansburg, deputy editor for Slate
 Jessica Winter, business and technology editor for Slate
Ben Smith, media columnist at The New York Times, founding editor-in-chief of BuzzFeed News

References

External links 
 
 "Yale's New Journal," published in The Crimson, December 2, 1967

Magazines established in 1967
1967 establishments in Connecticut
English-language magazines
Yale University publications
Magazines published in Connecticut